Summer Night: Live is a live jazz album by the Chick Corea Akoustic Band trio, featuring Chick Corea, John Patitucci and Dave Weckl. Recorded during a concert in Belgrade in 1987, it was released with Jazz Door, the former recorded and live jazz record label.

The set contained jazz standards from Miles Davis and John Coltrane, as well as several original quartets by Corea.

Track listing

Personnel
 Chick Corea – Piano
 John Patitucci – Bass
 Dave Weckl – Drum kit

References

1987 live albums
Chick Corea live albums